Lick Creek is a  long 4th order tributary to the Cape Fear River in Lee County, North Carolina.

Course
Lick Creek rises in a pond on the east side of Sanford, North Carolina and then flows northeasterly to join the Cape Fear River about 0.5 miles southwest of Brickhaven, North Carolina.

Watershed
Lick Creek drains  of area, receives about 47.6 in/year of precipitation, has a wetness index of 416.65 and is about 63% forested.

See also
List of rivers of North Carolina

References

Rivers of North Carolina
Rivers of Lee County, North Carolina
Tributaries of the Cape Fear River